Staton is a surname, of English origin and may refer to:
People

Aaron Staton, American actor
Adolphus Staton (1879 – 1964), American Sailor, Medal of Honor recipient 
Albert Staton (1899 - 1980), American Sportsman
Bill Staton (1929–2006), American pool player and restaurateur
Candi Staton (born 1940), American soul and gospel singer
Cecil Staton (born 1958), American politician from Georgia
Dakota Staton (1930–2007), American jazz vocalist 
David Alan Dave Staton (born 1968), American Baseball player
Dolly Staton (born 1932),  American athlete
Ken Staton (born 1972) American golfer
Jim Staton (1927–1993), American football player
Joe Staton (born 1948), American illustrator and comic book writer
John Staton (1902 - 1990), American Football Player and Business Executive 
Josephine L. Staton (born 1961), American federal judge 
Mick Staton (1940–2014), American politician from West Virginia
Rebekah Staton (born 1981), British actress 
Sarah Staton (born 1961), British sculptor
William Staton (1898–1983), British aviator and RAF officer

Others

Staton Correctional Facility a prison in Alabama